St. Catherine's High School is a private, Roman Catholic high school in Racine, Wisconsin.  It is a member of Siena Catholic Schools of Racine and the Catholic Schools of the Roman Catholic Archdiocese of Milwaukee.

History

St. Catherine's traces its origins to the fall of 1864 when the Racine Dominican Sisters 
 established an all-girls' day and boarding academy. In the fall of 1864, the Racine Dominican Sisters opened a day and boarding school for girls on property they purchased at Twelfth Street and Park Avenue. The school was named St. Catherine's Academy. In 1874, the Academy was chartered by the State of Wisconsin, with the power to confer academic honors.

In 1907, the facilities of the Park Avenue building were no longer able to accommodate all the young ladies who made application for study there. Accordingly, the Sisters erected a boarding school, known as Holy Rosary Academy at Corliss, (Sturtevant), Wisconsin; day students continued to attend St. Catherine's Academy. Holy Rosary was closed in 1917.

A statue of St. Thomas Aquinas, the great Dominican saint and scholar, was enshrined in a niche above the main entrance, for the institution was originally to be named in his honor being known as St. Thomas High School. The academy girls, however, prevailed upon authorities to retain the name of St. Catherine's.
In the fall of 1945, in order to accommodate all the students seeking admission, St. Catherine's inaugurated a double-shift schedule. Excavation for a new wing was begun in March 1947, and Archbishop Kiley of Milwaukee dedicated the building extending 175 feet south on Park Avenue in August 1949.

The lot on the east side of Park Avenue is now used as an athletic field by the school. It was given to the school to use when the Dominican Sisters built their new motherhouse, Siena Center, and had the old convent building which stood on that property demolished. The North Central Association has accredited St. Catherine's High School since 1937.

On August 1, 2018, St. Catherine's became part of the newly-founded Siena Catholic Schools in Racine operated under the Archdiocese of Milwaukee, and is no longer a sponsored ministry of the Racine Dominicans. However, a member of the Racine Dominicans will sit on the Board of Trustees for the indefinite future.

Basketball program
St. Catherine's is well known in the state for the success of the boys' basketball program.  3 of the team's coaches, Bob Letsch, John Mcguire, and Jim Kersten, have been inducted into the Wisconsin Basketball Coaches Association Hall of Fame (WBCA).
 
The Angels own a total of 15 state championships, nine from the Wisconsin Independent Schools Athletic Association (WISAA) and its predecessor, the Wisconsin Catholic Interscholastic Athletic Association (WCIAA), and six championships since joining the Wisconsin Interscholastic Athletic Association (WIAA) in 2000 (2005, 2006, 2007, 2009, 2010 and 2021).

Coach John Mcguire, (1951-1962,1965-1979) finished his career with team with a record of 511–112, six WISAA state championships, five runner-up finishes and nine conference titles. His teams went undefeated in 1960, 1968, and 1970.  He was inducted as a charter member into the Wisconsin Basketball Coaches Association's Hall of Fame in 1979 and into the Racine County Sports Hall of Fame in 2012.

Coach Robert "Bob" Letsch, (1979-2016) finished his career with a record 661–250, as the second-winningest high school basketball coach in Wisconsin's history. During his tenure, his teams compiled eight state championships in 1985, ’92, ’93, ’05, ’06, ’07, ’09 and ’10. He was inducted into the Wisconsin Basketball Coaches Association Hall of Fame in 2010 and the Racine County Sports Hall of Fame in 2013. His 2005-06 team went undefeated and  holds the record for the largest victory margin in a state-title game, when the Angels pounded Westby 69–29 in the Division 3 championship game. Letsch was named Associated Press All- State Coach of the Year twice, in 1992 and 2007, and Racine All-County Coach of the Year 5 times: 1985, 1992, 2000, 2003 and 2005.

In 2016, the team named Coach Nick Bennett to replace Letsch. He earned a state title in 2021, and was named Racine All-County, Associated Press All-State, and WBCA Coach of the Year. In July 2021, Bennett announced he was stepping down as coach of the Angels. He finished his career at St. Cat's with a record of 106-20.

On August 7, 2021 Coach Ryan Thompson was chosen to take over the basketball program as head coach.

Athletics 

St. Catherine's High School is a member of the Wisconsin Interscholastic Athletic Association(WIAA) and the Metro Classic Conference. The school offers the following sports:

Fall: football, boys' cross country, girls' cross country, boys' soccer, girls' volleyball, girls' swimming, girls' tennis, girls' golf, girls' pom pons

Winter: boys' basketball, girls' basketball, boys' bowling, girls' bowling, boys' swimming, girls' pom pons

Spring: baseball, boys' track & field, girls' track & field, boys' tennis, boys' golf, girls' soccer, girls' softball

Early history 
St. Catherine's athletic program began in 1926 with the hiring of Coach and Athletic Director Fred "Bud" Beyer, a law student from Marquette University. The first sports introduced were basketball, football, and coed bowling. The first competitive game played was basketball, versus St. John's Cathedral of Milwaukee on Friday, January 8, 1926, in which St. Cat's  lost 24 to 15. Beyer resigned in February 1927 and Eugene “Scrapiron” Young, a law student from the University of Notre Dame, was hired that March to fill the position. Baseball was introduced the same year with the hiring of  Coach J. George Fay, a league player from Milwaukee. In 1930, former Chicago Bear and Green Bay Packer, Thomas “Red” Hearden, took the reins of the athletic program.  That same year St. Cat's joined the Catholic Conference; which originally consisted of Pio Nono, St. Bonaventure, Messmer, Cathedral, and Marquette High Schools. In 1938, Don Bosco was added to the conference, and in 1948, Pius XI and St. Benedict's joined; making a total of 8 teams.  In 1957, the school joined the newly formed Wisconsin Catholic Interscholastic Athletic Association (WCIAA).  At that time, private schools were barred from the WIAA, so the WCIAA was formed to sanction tournaments to determine their own state champions.  In 1968, St. Cat's joined the 58 member Wisconsin Independent Schools Athletic Association (WISAA) which combined all private schools. In 1972, the WISAA launched the girls' sports program, which officially sanctioned volleyball, basketball, tennis, and track state tournaments. In 1997, the WIAA members passed a vote which paved the way for St. Cat's (and all private schools in the state) to join in 2000.

Originally nicknamed the "Saints," the school's team nickname was changed to the "Angels" beginning in the fall of 1940 in order to avoid confusion with other local high school teams with the same name.

WIAA State Championships (2000-present)

WISAA State Championships (1968-1999)

WCIAA State Championships (1958-1967)

Milwaukee Archdiocesan High School Athletic "Catholic Conference" Titles (1931-1957)

Notable alumni (year graduated)

 Dexter Baker (1967)- MiLB  professional baseball player
 Christopher Barker (1978) - MiLB  professional baseball player
 Gene Beery (1955) - American painter and photographer
 James Caspers (1950) - 1959 World Archery Championships Gold medalist
 W. Richard Chiapete (1983) - Racine District Attorney, 2012 to 2016
 Jim Chones (1969) - NBA professional basketball player
 Jason Paul Collum (1991) - American film and television director, author 
 Hon.Thomas P. Corbett (1933) - Wisconsin State Assemblyman and Racine County Judge, 1962 to 1980
 Hon. Howard DuRocher (1931) - WI State Judge, 1956 to 1962, Racine County Judge, 1962 to 1978
 Marcel Dandeneau (1950) - Wisconsin State Assemblyman
 Margaret Danhauser (1939) - AAGPBL professional women's baseball player
 Victor DeLorenzo (1973) - drummer for the alternative rock band, the Violent Femmes
 John Dickert (1981) - Mayor of Racine, WI, 2009 to 2017
 Margaret Farrow (1952) - first female lieutenant governor of Wisconsin
 Maj Gen Gregory A. Feest (1974) - Major General, U.S. Air Force (retired), former USAF Chief of Safety
 Hon. Dennis J. Flynn (1960) - Racine County Judge, 1976 to 2002
 Gerald T. Flynn (1928) - U.S. Congressman, Wisconsin 1st District, 1959 to 1961
 Hon. Eugene A. Gasiorkiewicz (1967) - Racine County Judge, 2010 to present
 George N. Gillett Jr. - American businessman
 Lt. Col. Robert Goebel (1941) - Lieutenant Colonel, U.S. Air Force (retired), WWII Double Ace, author: "MUSTANG ACE, Memoirs of a P-51 Fighter Pilot"
 Jim Haluska (1950) - NFL professional football player, legendary coach
 James E. Held (1956) - Wisconsin State Assemblyman
 Kevin Henkes (1979) - noted children's book author and illustrator
 James Herzog (1969) - MiLB  professional baseball player
 Chad Harbach (1993) - author, The Art of Fielding
 Hon. Kenneth Huck (1954) - Mayor of Racine, WI, 1969 to 1973
 RADM Donald Grote Iselin (1940) - Rear Admiral, United States Navy (retired), former Commander of NAVFAC and Chief of the Civil Engineer Corps
 Richard A. “Rick” Jackson Jr. (1963) - MLB professional baseball player
 Harvey Knuckles (1977) - Continental Basketball Association professional basketball player
 Hon. Richard J. Kreul (1955) - Racine County Judge, 1992 to 2012
 William Letsch (1971) -  MiLB  professional baseball player
 Matt Lojeski (2003) - AEK B.C. professional basketball player 
 Jim McIlvaine (1990) - NBA professional basketball player and Marquette radio announcer
 Jerry Mertens (1954) - NFL professional football player
 Harry Mares (1958) - former Mayor of White Bear Lake, MN, Minnesota state representative and educator
 Andrew Elvis Miller (1985) - American Actor, Director, early member of Blue Man Group
 Col. F. Don Miller (1938) - Colonel, U.S. Army (retired), Executive Director of the U.S. Olympic Committee, 1973 to 1984, 1943 NCAA Boxing Championship welterweight champion, Purple Heart recipient
 Don Penza (1950) - former Mayor of Wisconsin Rapids, WI, All-American collegian football player, legendary football coach
 Don Peterson (1946) - college football player
 Michael Petit (1969) - MiLB  professional baseball player
 John "Jack" Rogan (1950) - founder of Rogan's Shoes
 James F. Rooney (1954) - Wisconsin State Assemblyman, former Chairman of the Wisconsin Waterways Commission
 Vinny Rottino (1998) - MLB professional baseball player
 Howie Ruetz (1947) - NFL professional football player
 Charles Rutkowski (1956) - NFL professional football player
 Kyle Schlachter (1999) - Mayor of Littleton, CO, 2021 to present 
 Hon. Stephen Simanek (1963) - Racine County Judge, 1980 to 2010
 Richard J. Sklba (1952) - Catholic Bishop
 Don Smiley (1973) - President and Chief Executive Officer of Summerfest and former Major League Baseball executive
 Ralph Thomas (1948) - NFL professional football player, member of the 1951 San Francisco Dons football team
 LTG William Troy (1971) - Lieutenant General, U.S. Army (retired), former director of the U.S. Army Staff, Chief Executive Officer of American Society for Quality
 William "Bill" Weiss (1959) - Chief of Police, Menasha WI, 1979 to 2002 
 Jim Welsh (1956) - NFL professional football player
 Paul Weyrich (1960) - American religious conservative political activist and commentator
 Hon. James Wilbershide (1936) - Racine County Judge, 1971 to 1989
 Leonard W. Ziolkowski (1963) -  Racine County Executive, 1982 to 1989, Racine's Harbor Park is named in his honor

Notable faculty

 Tom Hearden - NFL professional football player, legendary coach
 Eugene "Scrapiron" Young - author, professional trainer, coach and attorney
 Eddie Race - WFCA hall of fame coach

Notes and references

External links
 School website

Roman Catholic Archdiocese of Milwaukee
High schools in Racine, Wisconsin
Catholic secondary schools in Wisconsin
Educational institutions established in 1864
Private middle schools in Wisconsin
1864 establishments in Wisconsin